Kerkhoven ("church yards" in Dutch) can refer to either:

Places
 Kerkhoven, Minnesota, United States
 Kerkhoven Township, Swift County, Minnesota, United States
 Kerkhoven (Netherlands), a former village, now a neighborhood of Oisterwijk, North Brabant
 , a hamlet in Belgian Limburg
 , a village in West Flanders, Belgium

Dutch surname
 Lesley Kerkhove (born 1991), Dutch tennis player
  (1946–2013), Belgian dramaturge and theater critic
 Robert Van Kerkhoven (born 1924), Belgian football midfielder
  (1848–1918), Dutch tea and coffee plantation owner on Java

Others
 11432 Kerkhoven, named after Rudolf Albert Kerkhoven (1879–1940), son of Rudolf Eduard Kerkhoven

See also
Kerkhof
Kerckhoven
Van Kerckhoven